The 2021–22 season was Morecambe's 98th season since formation, their 15th consecutive season in the Football League, and their first ever season in League One, the third tier of English football. They also competed in the FA Cup, EFL Cup and EFL Trophy.

During pre-season, Stephen Robinson was announced as the club's new manager on a three-year deal, succeeding Derek Adams who had departed to manage Bradford City.

Pre-season friendlies
On 18 June 2021, Morecambe announced matches against Workington, Chorley and Blackpool.

Competitions

EFL League One

League table

Results summary

Results by matchday

Matches
Morecambe's league fixtures were revealed at 09:00 BST on 24 June 2021.

FA Cup

Morecambe were drawn at home to Newport County in the first round, away to Buxton in the second round and to Tottenham Hotspur in the third round.

EFL Cup

Morecambe were drawn away to Blackburn Rovers in the first round and at home to Preston North End in the second round.

EFL Trophy

Morecambe were placed into pre-determined (to minimise travel) Northern Group A with League Two sides Carlisle United and Hartlepool United at 15:00 BST on 23 June 2021. At 16:30 the following day, live on Sky Sports, they were joined by Everton U23, Anton Ferdinand making the draw. Group stage matches were revealed on July 6.

Transfers

Transfers in

Loans in

Loans out

Transfers out

Footnotes

References

Morecambe
Morecambe F.C. seasons